The Miss District of Columbia USA competition is the pageant that selects the representative for the District of Columbia in the Miss USA pageant. Four District of Columbia representatives have won the Miss USA title. Of those two, Deshauna Barber and Kára McCullough won successive Miss USA titles in 2016 and 2017. The most recent placement was Faith Porter in 2022, placing Top 16.

Two Miss District of Columbia USA titleholders previously held the Miss District of Columbia Teen USA title and three have competed at Miss America.

Faith Porter of Bowie, Maryland is crowned Miss District of Columbia USA 2022 on June 5, 2022 at the Renaissance Washington, DC Downtown Hotel in Washington, D.C. She represented District of Columbia for the title of Miss USA 2022, placed at the Top 16.

Gallery of titleholders

Results summary

Placements
Miss USAs: Bobbie Johnson (1964), Shauntay Hinton (2002), Deshauna Barber (2016), Kára McCullough (2017)
1st runners-up: Michelle Metrinko (1963), Liane Angus (2001)
4th runners-up: Diana Batts (1965), Steffanee Leaming (1984)
Top 10/12: Nikki Phillipp (1970), Susan Pluskoski (1971), Janet Gail Greenawalt (1972), Nancy Plachta (1973), Robin Utterback (1974), Mary Lamond (1975), Sharon Sutherland (1977), Catherine Staples (1990), Candace Allen (2006), Cordelia Cranshaw (2019) 
Top 15/16: Laura Farley (1954), Helen Sweeney (1962), Myra Chudy (1967), Sue Counts (1966), Cierra Jackson (2020), Faith Porter (2022)
District of Columbia holds a record of 24 placements at Miss USA.

Awards
Miss Congeniality: Elva Anderson (1988), Napiera Groves (1997)

Winners 
Color key

References

Bertha Pincus 1932

External links
 Miss District of Columbia USA official website

District of Columbia
Culture of Washington, D.C.
Women in Washington, D.C.
Recurring events established in 1952
1952 establishments in Washington, D.C.
Annual events in Washington, D.C.